Pomaulax gibberosus, common name the red turban,  is a species of medium-sized to large sea snail with a calcareous operculum, a marine gastropod mollusk in the family Turbinidae, the turban snails.

Distribution
This species lives in the Eastern Pacific, from British Columbia, Canada, to Baja California, Mexico.

References

 Noodt J. (1819) Museum Boltenianum: Verzeichnis der von dem gestorbenen J.F. Bolten... hinterlassenen vortrefflichen Sammlung Conchylien, Mineralien und Kunstsachen die am 26. April d.J., Morgens um 10 Uhr öffentlich verkauft werden sollen durch den Makler J. Noodt. Conrad Müller, Hamburg
 Philippi R.A. 1846. Diagnoses testaceorum quorundam novorum. Zeitschrift für Malakozoologie, 1846(7): 97-106

Further reading
 Turgeon, D.D., et al. 1998. Common and scientific names of aquatic invertebrates of the United States and Canada. American Fisheries Society Special Publication 26 page(s): 59
 Alf A. & Kreipl K. (2011) The family Turbinidae. Subfamilies Turbininae Rafinesque, 1815 and Prisogasterinae Hickman & McLean, 1990. In: G.T. Poppe & K. Groh (eds), A Conchological Iconography. Hackenheim: Conchbooks. pp. 1–82, pls 104-245

External links
 Philippi R.A. 1846. Diagnoses testaceorum quorundam novorum. Zeitschrift für Malakozoologie, 1846(7): 97-106
 Dall W.H. (1919). Descriptions of new species of Mollusca from the North Pacific Ocean in the collection of the United States National Museum. Proceedings of the United States National Museum. 56: 293-371

gibberosus
Gastropods described in 1817
Taxa named by Lewis Weston Dillwyn